This is a list of neighbourhoods in the Resort Municipality of Whistler, British Columbia.  Certain non-neighbourhood locations and development complexes are also included.
Alpha Lake Village
Alpine Meadows
Alta Lake (West Side Road)/Rainbow Lodge not to be confused with Rainbow ski hill or Rainbow Estates
Alta Vista
Bayshores
Blackcomb Benchlands
Brio
Cheakamus Crossing: Cheakamus (abr.) site of former Whistler Olympic and Paralympic Village (his.), also known as   Athletes' Village (his.) for the 2010 Winter Olympics venues, Whistler
Emerald Estates
 Function Junction Industrial  and Commercial zone, southern Whistler, west of Cheakamus Crossing
Mons
Nesters
Nicklaus North
 Nordic Estates Official, Club Cabins (subsection )
Nordic Estates Official, south end Nicknamed Rimrock
Rainbow Estates   Newest subdivision, between Alpine and Emerald . Site of Ski Rainbow was Whistler’s ‘other’ ski hill:  bunny hill + ski jump, 1968–1981.
Spring Creek
Tamarisk Estates
Whistler Cay Estates: Whistler Cay (abv.)
Whistler Creekside: Alpha Lake(his), Southside, Whistler Creek
Whistler Highlands
Whistler Village
White Gold

Outside of RMOW  Resort Municipality of Whistler
McGuire's/Northair (Callaghan cut-off)
Black Tusk Estates15 min south of Whistler town limits, in the SLRD, Squamish Lillooet Regional District
Pemberton, British Columbia a Whistler Bedroom Community 20 min North, separate municipality.

See also
Garibaldi(his.) defunct

Whistler, British Columbia
Whistler